William McAndrew (April 29, 1887 – February 11, 1943) was an American football, basketball, and baseball coach and college athletics administrator. He served two stints at the head football coach at Southern Illinois University Carbondale, from 1913 to 1916 and then returning from 1921 to 1938, compiling a record of 83–79–20 in 22 seasons. His 83 wins are the most of any head coach in the history of the Southern Illinois Salukis football program.  McAndrew was also the head basketball coach at Southern Illinois from 1913 to 1943, tallying a mark of 309–221, and the school head baseball coach from 1921 to 1924.

McAndrew was an alumnus of Vincennes University where he was a member of Sigma Pi fraternity.  He also played professionally in the Central League before becoming a coach and teacher.

McAndrew Stadium on the Southern Illinois campus was named for him in 1943.

McAndrew was born in Lawrenceville, Illinois, and served as a captain in the United States Army during World War I.  After the war he stayed in the National Guard and rose to the rank of brigadier general.  He was a coach for the Lawrenceville Township High School until taking the job at SIU.  When he died he was the commanding officer of the Third Brigade of the Illinois National Guard.  He died on February 11, 1943, in Carbondale, Illinois.

Head coaching record

College football

References

External links
 

1887 births
1943 deaths
Southern Illinois Salukis athletic directors
Southern Illinois Salukis baseball coaches
Southern Illinois Salukis football coaches
Southern Illinois Salukis men's basketball coaches
United States Army personnel of World War I
Basketball coaches from Illinois
United States Army officers
Vincennes University alumni
People from Lawrenceville, Illinois
National Guard (United States) generals
Illinois National Guard personnel